Nushor (Russian and Tajik: Нушор) is a village and jamoat in Tajikistan. It is located in Tojikobod District, one of the Districts of Republican Subordination. The jamoat has a total population of 11,608 (2015). It consists of 14 villages, including Kanyshbek.

Notes

References

Populated places in Districts of Republican Subordination
Jamoats of Tajikistan